Marshyhope Creek is a  tributary of the Nanticoke River on the Delmarva Peninsula. It rises in Kent County, Delaware, and runs through Caroline County, Maryland, and Dorchester County, Maryland.

Marshyhope Creek begins in southwestern Kent County, Delaware, near the city of Harrington, and ends at the Nanticoke River, near Sharptown, Maryland. The entire watershed is in the coastal plain and reaches sea level at Federalsburg, The head of navigation.

There are several small creeks on the western shore, including Faulkner Branch, Sullivan Branch, Capital Branch, Green Branch, and Horsepen Arm. On the eastern shore the small creeks include Tanyard Branch, Houston Branch, Jones Mill Branch, Double Fork Branch, Quarter Branch, Tomahawk Branch, and Prospect Point Branch.

See also
List of rivers of Delaware

External Links 
 Natural Atlas (Marshyhope Creek)
 Upper Marshyhope Creek

References

United States Geological Survey. 7.5 minute series topographic quadrangles

Tributaries of the Nanticoke River
Rivers of Delaware
Rivers of Maryland
Rivers of Kent County, Delaware
Rivers of Caroline County, Maryland
Rivers of Dorchester County, Maryland